Edward Dennis (born 22 March 1986) is a Welsh professional wrestler, and former head teacher. He is most recently signed to WWE, where he performed in NXT UK under the name Eddie Dennis. Originally a mathematics teacher, Dennis retired from teaching to wrestle full-time.

Professional wrestling career
Dennis began his wrestling career in 2008, whilst working full-time as a mathematics teacher in Cardiff, and later at LVS Ascot in Berkshire, where he became head teacher. In 2016, he left his job to become a full-time wrestler. Despite an unsuccessful first try-out with the WWE in 2017, he later would wrestle on the first NXT UK show at the Plymouth Pavilions.

Attack! Pro Wrestling (2011, 2013–2019) 
Dennis's debut match was a live Attack! event held on August 12, 2011, where he defeated by fellow Welshman Wild Boar. Along with Wild Boar, Dennis shared the Attack! ring with Mark Andrews, Pete Dunne and Flash Morgan Webster, who would all join NXT UK. On December 21, 2013, Dennis won his first title, winning the Attack! 24:7 Championship. After losing the title within minutes, he has held the Attack! 24:7 Championship on a further three occasions. On November 20, 2016, Dennis defeated Mike Bird to become the inaugural Attack! Champion, holding the championship until February 25, 2017, where he lost it to Damian Dunne. On November 18, Dennis became the first wrestler to hold the Attack! Championship on two occasions by defeating Wild Boar on September 19, 2018. On December 15, Dennis would once again lose the Championship to Damian Dunne.

RevPro Wrestling (2014–2018) 
Eddie Dennis made his RevPro debut in 2014, on May 10, where he teamed with Mark Andrews and Pete Dunne against Josh Bodom, Sha Samuels and Terry Frazier in a 6-person tag match. On August 30, 2015, Dennis was defeated by James Castle. On May 1, 2016, Dennis lost against Sha Samuels On November 6, 2016, Dennis was defeated by Josh Bodom. The pair had a rematch on January 8, 2017, where Dennis lost against to Bodom. On February 5, 2017, Dennis faced off and eventually lost against Dave Mastiff. On May 5, 2017, Zack Gibson defeated Dennis. On April 9, 2017, Dennis lost against Rob Lias. On May 7, 2017, Dennis lost against Gideon Grey. On June 4, 2017, Dennis lost against Donovan Dijak. On July 2, 2017, Dennis was defeated by Sami Callihan. On August 6, 2017, Dennis lost against T.K Cooper. On August 17, 2017, Dennis lost to Martin Stone. On September 3, 2017, Dennis was defeated by El Phantasmo. On October 1, 2017, David Starr won against Eddie Dennis. On October 15, 2017, Dennis was defeated by Chris Brookes. On October 22, 2017, Dennis was beaten by Moose. On November 5, 2017, Rob Lias won against Dennis due to a disqualification. On December 8, 2017, Dennis lost against Pete Dunne. On January 7, 2018, Gideon Grey defeated Dennis by disqualification.

Progress Wrestling (2013–present) 
Dennis debuted on March 31, 2013, at Chapter Six: We Heart Violence, where he and Mark Andrews went under the tag team name Team Defend, losing to The Bhangra Knights (Darrell Allen & RJ Singh). At Chapter Seven: Every Saint Has A Past, Every Sinner Has A Future, Dennis would defeat Darrell Allen, Joey Lakeside and Xander Cooper in a four-way elimination match. At Chapter Eight: The Big Boys Guide To Strong Style, Dennis would compete in a Three-Way match against Darrell Allen and Doug Williams, where Dennis would be defeated by Williams. At Chapter Nine: Hold Me, Thrill Me, Kick Me, Kill Me, Dennis would be defeated by Paul Robinson. At Chapter Eleven: To Fight War, You Must Become War, Eddie Dennis and Mark Andrews defeated Paul Robinson and Will Ospreay Dennis won his first championship on March 30, 2014 during Chapter Twelve: We're Gonna Need A Bigger Room. Dennis and Andrews under the team name FSU won a tournament final three-way, defeating teams Mark Haskins & Nathan Cruz and Project Ego (Kris Travis & Martin Kirby). At Chapter 13: Unbelievable Jeff, Dennis was defeated by Michael Gilbert. At Chapter 14: Thunderbastard, FSU (Mark Andrews and Eddie Dennis) would successfully defend their tag team championships against The London Riots (James Davis and Rob Lynch). On Chapter 15: Just Because You're Paranoid, Doesn't Mean They Aren't Out To Get You, Dennis teamed up with Mark Andrews, Noam Dar and Will Ospreay to defeat James Davis, Jimmy Havoc, Paul Robinson and Rob Lynch in an 8-man tag match. They would retain the tag titles over the course of the year, successfully defending them on November 30, at Chapter 16, defeating team Screw Indy Wrestling (Martin Stone & Sha Samuels). On January 25, 2015, Dennis would face off against his partner, Mark Andrews where Dennis would defeat Andrews and deliver a promo about Andrews' contract at TNA and his own application to be a headmaster. Five days later, on January 30, 2015, at Chapter 17, Team FSU lost the tag titles to the team referred to as The Faceless. On July 23, 2017, Dennis faced off against Pete Dunne, where Dennis would lose the match. On May 8, 2018, whilst on a tour in the US, Eddie Dennis would face off against Ricky Shane Page, where Dennis defeated RSP. On September 30, 2018, Dennis would face Mark Andrews at a TLC match, with the winner earning an opportunity to compete on the next Unboxing event, which ended in Dennis winning the match. On November 12, 2018, Dennis faced "Speedball" Mike Bailey, where Dennis defeated Bailey. On November 26, 2018, Dennis faced Mark Haskins, the match ending with Dennis winning the match. On December 12, 2018, at Unboxing 3, Dennis faced Marcel Barthel, where Dennis would beat Barthel. In later matches during the course of his time in Progress Wrestling, Dennis would wrestle with individuals all of whom would become future WWE NXT UK roster members including Zack Gibson, Mark Andrews, "Wild Boar" Mike Hitchman, El Ligero, Dave Mastiff, Nixon Newell and others.

WWE (2018–2022) 
Dennis made his televised debut during the November 7, 2018 episode NXT UK, during which he defeated Sid Scala. His final match of the year was during the December 26 episode of NXT UK, defeating Dan Moloney by disqualification.

Dennis returned the following year on the January 2, 2019 episode of NXT UK, during which his match against Dave Mastiff ended in double-disqualification. On 12 January at NXT UK TakeOver: Blackpool, Dennis met Mastiff in a rematch under No Disqualification rules, but lost to Mastiff. On the January 23 episode, 2019, of NXT UK, Dennis defeated Jamie Ahmed. On the March 20, 2019, episode of NXT UK, Dennis defeated Ligero. On January 12, 2020, at Takeover: Blackpool 2, Dennis defeated Trent Seven. The way he won the match at Takeover caused a rematch between the two in a Steel Corners Street Fight on February 6, where Seven defeated Dennis.

On 18 August 2022, Dennis was released from his WWE contract.

Personal life 
Dennis is the co-founder of "Defend Indy Wrestling", a clothing brand for independent wrestling fans. Inspired by the "Defend Pop Punk" message propagated by American band Man Overboard, Dennis created the brand in 2011 with fellow British wrestlers Pete Dunne and Mark Andrews, producing t-shirts, hoodies and other accessories.

Championships and accomplishments
 Attack! Pro Wrestling
Attack! 24:7 Championship (4 times)
Attack! Championship (2 times, Inaugural)
Attack Championship Tournament (2016)
 Pro Wrestling Chaos
 King Of Chaos Championship (1 time)
 Knights Of Chaos Championship (1 time, Inaugural) - with Alex Steele
Knights of Chaos Championship Tournament (2016)
 Pro Wrestling Illustrated 
 Ranked No. 213 of the top 500 singles wrestlers in the PWI 500 in 2019
 Progress Wrestling
 Progress Tag Team Championship (1 time) - with Mark Andrews
 Progress Tag Team Title Tournament (2014) – with Mark Andrews
Progress Unified World Championship (1 time)
 South Coast Wrestling
 One To Watch Trophy Championship (1 time)
 Triple X Wrestling
TXW Championship (1 time)
 Entertainment Wrestling Association 
EWA Championship (1 time)

References

External links
 
 
 

1986 births
Living people
Sportspeople from Swansea
Welsh male professional wrestlers
Mathematics educators
Welsh educators
21st-century professional wrestlers
PROGRESS World Champions
PROGRESS Tag Team Champions